The  897th Helicopter Reconnaissance and Liaison Squadron (Serbo-Croatian: 897. helikopterska eskadrila za izviđanje i vezu / 897. хеликоптерска ескадрила за извиђање и везу) was an aviation squadron of Yugoslav Air Force formed in 1981 at Brnik airport 897th Helicopter Flight (Serbo-Croatian: 897. helikoptersko odeljenje / 897. хеликоптерско одељење).

The helicopter flight was formed by order from August 18, 1981, for with 9th Army of Yugoslav People's Army for reconnaissance and liaison duties equipped with domestic made Soko SA,341 Gazelle helicopters. By order from March 1, 1985, it is designated as 897th Helicopter Reconnaissance and Liaison Squadron. Due to the 1988 reorganization of field armies of Yugoslav People's Army, 897th Squadron has been attached to 894th Liaison Aviation Squadron as its helicopter flight.

Assignments
9th Army (1981–1988)

Previous designations
897th Helicopter Flight (1981-1985)
897th Helicopter Reconnaissance and Liaison Squadron (1985-1988)

Equipment
Soko SA.341 Gazelle Hera (1981–1988)

References

Yugoslav Air Force squadrons
Military units and formations established in 1981